Beef Creek is a stream in the U.S. state of South Dakota.

Beef Creek was named for the fact ranchers would allow their cattle to graze there.

See also
List of rivers of South Dakota

References

Rivers of Fall River County, South Dakota
Rivers of South Dakota